Jameson is an unincorporated community in Koochiching County, Minnesota, United States. It is a surrounding community of International Falls, located along the Rainy River.

State Highway 11 (MN 11) is the main route through Jameson, connecting it to the cities of International Falls to the west and Ranier to the east.

Jameson is within the unorganized territory of Rainy Lake, which covers the northeastern part of Koochiching County.

References

Unincorporated communities in Minnesota
Unincorporated communities in Koochiching County, Minnesota